Gipe is a surname. Notable people with the surname include:

George Gipe (1933–1986), American writer
Jasmina Perazić-Gipe (born 1960), Serbian-American basketball coach
Lawrence Gipe (born 1962), American painter
Paul Gipe, renewable energy commentator
Yukki Gipe (musician) member of the post-punk band Bullet LaVolta

See also
 Gyp (disambiguation)